Darren Pyper, better known by his stage name Ghettosocks, is a Juno-nominated Canadian hip hop artist and member of the Backburner collective. In early 2010, Ghettosocks' album Treat of the Day spent several weeks at #1 on ChartAttack's Canadian Hip-Hop chart, and his single "Don't Turn Around" won Rap/Hip‐Hop Single Track Recording of the Year at the 2011 East Coast Music Awards.

See also

Canadian hip hop

References

External links
Official website

Year of birth missing (living people)
Living people
Musicians from Ottawa
Canadian male rappers
21st-century Canadian rappers
Underground rappers
21st-century Canadian male musicians